Bellingham High School is a public high school in the Bellingham School District located in Bellingham, Washington.  The school serves students primarily from Whatcom, Kulshan, and Shuksan Middle Schools.

History
Bellingham High School was dedicated on February 25, 1938.  It cost $912,028.63 and took 417,026 man hours to build.

The school was closed for two years starting in June 1998 for a massive renovation which involved gutting the entire building and even demolishing some portions.  Special care was taken to preserve the art deco facade on the west side of the building.

From its inception the school mascot was the "Red Raider", a Native American chief with a massive war bonnet.  In the years leading up to the school's renovation there were several occasions where questions were raised about the cultural appropriateness of such a mascot.  When the school re-opened In 2000 after a two-year closure the mascot was changed to a bird of prey, but the mascot and team name "Red Raider" remained. Beginning in 2022, the school mascot was changed to the Bayhawks.

Academics
Bellingham High School offers a curriculum including Advanced Placement courses and other classes to prepare students for college, as well as offering the Running Start program which allows students to complete their high school diploma and earn college credit by attending Bellingham Technical College and/or Whatcom Community College.

Athletics
Bellingham, competing in the  Washington Interscholastic Activities Association's Northwest Conference, participates in thirteen varsity sports: baseball, basketball, cross country, fastpitch, football, golf, gymnastics, soccer, swimming, tennis, track, volleyball, and wrestling. In 2021, the school adopted a new mascot, the Bayhawks.

Activities
Bellingham offers students a wide variety of activities and clubs including Band, BAM, Cheerleading, Chess Club, Choir, Color Guard, Dance Team, Debate, DECA, Drama Club, Engineering Club, Environmental Club, FBLA, German Club, Gay/Straight Alliance, Honor Society, Newspaper Club, IAM, Key Club, Literary Arts Magazine, Math Team, Orchestra, Stage Crew and production, Teen Court, and Yearbook.

Notable alumni
 Cliff Chambers, Former MLB player (Chicago Cubs, Pittsburgh Pirates, St. Louis Cardinals)
 Stephen S. Oswald, NASA astronaut.
 Cuddles Marshall, Former MLB player (New York Yankees, St. Louis Browns)
 Roger Repoz, Former MLB player (New York Yankees, Kansas City Athletics, California Angels)
 Kevin Richardson, Major League Baseball player.
 Steve Alvord, National Football League player.
 Harriett Davenport, Los Angeles, California, City Council member, 1953–55
 Lee Boyd Malvo, one of the D.C. snipers

References

External links
Bellingham High School
OSPI School Report Card, 2012-13

High schools in Whatcom County, Washington
Educational institutions established in 1938
Schools in Bellingham, Washington
Public high schools in Washington (state)
1938 establishments in Washington (state)